Jean-Pierre Vermetten (born 6 February 1895, date of death unknown) was a Belgian freestyle swimmer and water polo player who competed in the 1920 Summer Olympics and in the 1924 Summer Olympics.

In 1920 he was a member of the Belgian freestyle relay team which was eliminated in the first round of the 4 x 200 metre freestyle relay event. Four years later he won the silver medal with the Belgian water polo team. He played four matches and scored one goal.

See also
 List of Olympic medalists in water polo (men)

References

External links
 

1895 births
Year of death missing
Belgian male water polo players
Olympic swimmers of Belgium
Olympic water polo players of Belgium
Swimmers at the 1920 Summer Olympics
Water polo players at the 1924 Summer Olympics
Olympic silver medalists for Belgium
Olympic medalists in water polo
Medalists at the 1924 Summer Olympics
Place of birth missing
Belgian male freestyle swimmers